James H. Gardner (March 29, 1910 – April 9, 2000) was an American college basketball coach, known for his tenures as the head coach at Kansas State University and the University of Utah. He is a member of the Naismith Memorial Basketball Hall of Fame.

Born in Texico, New Mexico, Gardner was raised in southern California, and was a four-sport athlete in high school at Redlands. A graduate of the University of Southern California in Los Angeles, he was the captain of the Trojan basketball team and led the Pacific Coast Conference (PCC) in scoring. Gardner coached at Kansas State from 1939 to 1942 and 1946 to 1953, compiling a 147–81 record with the Wildcats, and thereafter coaching at Utah from 1953 to 1971, compiling a 339–154 record.

In his second stint at Kansas State, following World War II, Gardner's teams won three conference crowns and captured two Big Eight Holiday Tournament championships.  His 1950–51 team finished 25–4 and lost in the finals of the NCAA tournament to the University of Kentucky.  That team was arguably the best in K-State history, and one of two that reached the Final Four during his tenure (the other was in 1948). He had six All-Americans at Kansas State, including Ernie Barrett.

Gardner left Manhattan, Kansas, in 1953 to take over the head coaching reins at the University of Utah in Salt Lake City, where he remained for 18 years.  He led the Utes to six appearances in the NCAA tournament and two Final Four appearances (1961 & 1966). To date, Gardner remains one of only three coaches to twice lead two different programs to the Final Four, along with  Roy Williams and Rick Pitino, and won eight conference titles.  Between 1959 and 1962, his teams compiled a  record; Gardner was often referred to as "The Fox" and known for his fast-break style, putting the "run" into the "Runnin' Utes." He had five All-Americans at Utah, including Billy "The Hill" McGill. 

Gardner is a member of the Naismith Basketball Hall of Fame as well as ten other Halls of Fame.  He was inducted into the Kansas Sports Hall of Fame in 2000 and is also a member of the Southern Utah Hall of Fame, Utah All-Sports Hall of Fame, State of Utah Basketball Hall of Fame, Helms Foundation Hall of Fame, Kansas State University Hall of Fame, Crimson Club (University of Utah), Modesto Junior College Hall of Fame, Redlands High School Hall of Fame, and College Basketball Hall of Fame.  He was also the recipient of the National Association of Basketball Coaches' Golden Anniversary Award.

Gardner worked as a consultant for the Utah Jazz of the National Basketball Association (NBA) from 1979 (when the team moved from New Orleans) until 1995.  He is credited with discovering point guard John Stockton from Gonzaga University while working for the Jazz.

Gardner died at age 90 in 2000 in Salt Lake City.

Head coaching record

See also
 List of NCAA Division I Men's Final Four appearances by coach

References

External links
 
 Sports Reference – Jack Gardner

1910 births
2000 deaths
American men's basketball players
Basketball coaches from New Mexico
Basketball players from New Mexico
College men's basketball head coaches in the United States
Kansas State Wildcats men's basketball coaches
Naismith Memorial Basketball Hall of Fame inductees
National Collegiate Basketball Hall of Fame inductees
People from Curry County, New Mexico
USC Trojans men's basketball players
Utah Jazz personnel
Utah Utes men's basketball coaches